Your Woman Sleep With Others (Traditional Chinese: 老王樂隊) is a Taiwanese folk rock band. The band was established in 2015 in Taipei, Taiwan. It currently consists of five members: Zhang Lichang (lead singer), Tong Weishuo (guitar), Liao Jiemin (drums), Feng Huiyuan (bass), and Shao Jiaying (cello). 

The band is most well-known for their EP Stolen Childhood (吾十有五而志於學), which focuses on the failures of the Taiwanese education system. In 2018, the band won the Golden Indie Award Best Folk Single for the song "Cram Schools Killed the Children" on the same album.

Name 
The band's Chinese name, 老王樂隊 (Lǎowáng yuèduì), directly translates to "Old Wang Band." In Chinese, "Old Wang" is often used as slang for the man next door whose wife has an affair. This is the origin of the band's English name, "Your Woman Sleep With Others."

According to lead singer Zhang Lichang, the name is meant to reflect the band's cynical approach to both the Taiwanese education system and music-making.

History 

The band was originally created in late 2015 by members Zhang Lichang, Feng Huiyuan, and Tong Weishuo in order to compete in a college music competition. In 2016, the band gained notoriety due to their success at college music competitions around Taiwan. Their most significant achievement was earning first prize at the music competitions at Tamkang University and National Chengchi University for their song "Stable Life, Suffer Exams." This earned them the title "Double Gold Champion" (金韶金旋雙冠), launching the band into the national spotlight.

On September 28, 2017, the band released their first EP, entitled Stolen Childhood (吾十有五而志於學). This album revolves around the despair and hopelessness caused by the Taiwanese education system. In 2018, the band won the Golden Indie Award "Best Folk Single" for the song "Cram Schools Killed the Children." Additionally, this EP earned the band a Golden Indie Award nomination for "Best New Band." The most popular song from this album, "Teens Edge," has received over 19 million views on YouTube.

On November 8, 2019, the band released their album I Examine Myself Three Times a Day (吾日三省吾身). 

Ironically, despite the band's critique of the Taiwanese education system, four of the five members are still college students. As of December 2019, the only member who has completely graduated from college is cellist Shao Jiaying.

Members 

 Zhang Lichang (張立長) - lead singer, acoustic guitar
 Tong Weishuo（童偉碩) - electric guitar
 Liao Jiemin（廖潔民) - bass, vocals
 Feng Huiyuan（馮會元) -  drums, vocals
 Shao Jiaying（邵佳瑩) - cello, vocals

Discography

EP

Albums

References

External links 

 Your Woman Sleep With Others Facebook Page
 Your Woman Sleep With Others YouTube
 Your Woman Sleep With Others Twitter

Taiwanese musical groups